Stari Banovci is a suburban settlement in Serbia. It is located in the Stara Pazova municipality, in the region of Syrmia (Syrmia District), Vojvodina province. Stari Banovci, Banovci-Dunav and Novi Banovci form together urban settlement Banovci. The population of the settlement as the whole is 16,000 people (2011 census).

Name
The name of the settlement in Serbian is plural.

History

In ancient times, Roman fortress named Burgene existed at this location. The village of Banovci existed here since the 16th century, and perhaps even before that. Another two villages, Darinovci and Tusa, were situated at this location, but both were later resettled.

According to the Ottoman census from 1566/7, most of the inhabitants of Banovci were Serbs. In 1734, the population of the village was composed of 53 houses. In 1756, population numbered 211 houses.

During the Axis occupation in World War II, 158 villagers were murdered, 52 were sent to concentration camp Sajmište, 38 were sent to forced labour, and 104 were held as war prisoners.

Tourism
International hiking- and bikingroute Sultans Trail goes thru Banovci. Both routes follow the old route from Budapest to Istanbul

Historical population

1948: 2,029
1953: 2,074
1961: 2,374
1971: 2,829
1981: 3,393
1991: 4,033
2002: 5,488 
2011: 5,954

Family names of the villagers

Some of the families in the village include: Antić, Azlen, Ašćerić, Babić, Bajić, Barišić, Bogdanovic, Bošković, Damjanac, Dražeta, Drljača, Đorđević, Đurić, Girgis, Glumac, Gojković, Grabovica, Gugleta, Hinić, Ilić, Janjic, Jekić, Jevtic, Jojić, Jovanović, Kasagic, Knežević, Korlat, Korolija, Kosovic, Kovačević, Kristić, Krndija, Krnjic, Lazarević, Leskur, Levnajić, Lukic,  Malbaša, Malenić, Maljković, Marković, Markulin, Mijačević, Mijatović, Miljković, Mirilovic, Mrđić, Nikolić, Obradovic, Ostojić, Petrović, Pražić, Preočanin, Prnjić, Prtina, Punos, Purić, Radojčić, Riđošić, Sasin, Savić, Skerletović, Slavik, Srebro, Sovilj, Stanković, Stanišić, Šaula, Šimunović, Tadic, Tesic, Tica, Tišma, Trninić, Tomašević, Tufegdzic, Ušljebrka, Večerinac, Vezmar, Vidaković, Vojnović, Vujasinović, Vukadinović, Vuković, Vuckovic, Zeljug, Zorić, Zubovic, etc.

Education

There is a primary school Slobodan Savković in the village.

See also
Stara Pazova
Syrmia District
List of places in Serbia
List of cities, towns and villages in Vojvodina

References

Milorad Babić - Petar Vukelić - Sretenije Zorkić, Hronika Starih Banovaca, Sremska Mitrovica, 1989.
Sreta Pecinjački, Stari Banovci do kraja 18. veka, Matica srpska, Zbornik za društvene nauke 36, Novi Sad, 1963.
Slobodan Ćurčić, Broj stanovnika Vojvodine, Novi Sad, 1996.

External links 

Stari Banovci
 Banovci City web portal

Populated places in Syrmia